The 1838 United States elections occurred in the middle of Democratic President Martin Van Buren's term, during the Second Party System. Members of the 26th United States Congress were chosen in this election.

Whigs picked up a moderate number of seats in both the House and Senate, but the Democratic Party retained a majority in both chambers. However, due to a split in the Democratic party, Whig Congressman Robert M. T.  Hunter was elected to be the Speaker of the House.

See also
1838–39 United States House of Representatives elections
1838–39 United States Senate elections

References

 
1838
United States midterm elections